Aspilota is a genus of insect from the Braconidae family.

Subgenera:
 Aspilota (Eusynaldis); earlier treated as its own genera Eusynaldis Zaykov & Fischer, 1982 
 Aspilota (Synaldis); earlier treated as its own genera Synaldis Förster, 1863

Species
The following species are accepted within Aspilota:

 Aspilota acricornis
 Aspilota acutistigma
 Aspilota adventa
 Aspilota aestiva
 Aspilota affinis
 Aspilota ahrburgensis
 Aspilota albiapex
 Aspilota alexanderi
 Aspilota alexandri
 Aspilota anaphoretica
 Aspilota andyaustini
 Aspilota angusticornis
 Aspilota aniva
 Aspilota anneae
 Aspilota antzyferovi
 Aspilota armillariae
 Aspilota arsenievi
 Aspilota astoriensis
 Aspilota atlasovi
 Aspilota aureliana
 Aspilota austroussurica
 Aspilota beringi
 Aspilota betae
 Aspilota blasii
 Aspilota brachybasis
 Aspilota brachyclypeata
 Aspilota brachyptera
 Aspilota brandti
 Aspilota breviantennata
 Aspilota brevicauda
 Aspilota brunigaster
 Aspilota brunnea
 Aspilota bucculatricis
 Aspilota budogosskii
 Aspilota capitata
 Aspilota caudatula
 Aspilota cetiusmontis
 Aspilota ceylonica
 Aspilota chanka
 Aspilota chinganica
 Aspilota claricornis
 Aspilota clayensis
 Aspilota columbiana
 Aspilota communis
 Aspilota compressa
 Aspilota compressigaster
 Aspilota compressiventris
 Aspilota converginervis
 Aspilota convexula
 Aspilota cubitalaris
 Aspilota cultrata
 Aspilota curta
 Aspilota curtibasis
 Aspilota daemon
 Aspilota dangerfieldi
 Aspilota danuvica
 Aspilota delicata
 Aspilota deserta
 Aspilota dezhnevi
 Aspilota digitula
 Aspilota diminuata
 Aspilota discoidea
 Aspilota disstriae
 Aspilota divergens
 Aspilota dmitrii
 Aspilota ecur
 Aspilota efoveolata
 Aspilota elongata
 Aspilota ephemera
 Aspilota eumandibulata
 Aspilota eurugosa
 Aspilota extremicornis
 Aspilota farra
 Aspilota ferrugenosa
 Aspilota flagellaris
 Aspilota flagimilis
 Aspilota florens
 Aspilota floridensis
 Aspilota foliformis
 Aspilota foutsi
 Aspilota fukushimai
 Aspilota furtnerana
 Aspilota fuscicornis
 Aspilota girlanda
 Aspilota glabrimedia
 Aspilota golovnini
 Aspilota gorbusha
 Aspilota hastata
 Aspilota hirticornis
 Aspilota impar
 Aspilota imparidens
 Aspilota incongruens
 Aspilota indica
 Aspilota inflatinervis
 Aspilota inflatitempus
 Aspilota insolita
 Aspilota insularis
 Aspilota intermediana
 Aspilota intermissa
 Aspilota iocosipecta
 Aspilota isfahanensis
 Aspilota isometrica
 Aspilota iuxtanaeviam
 Aspilota izyaslavi
 Aspilota jabingensis
 Aspilota jaculans
 Aspilota jakovlevi
 Aspilota johnbrackeni
 Aspilota kalinovka
 Aspilota kaplanovi
 Aspilota karafuta
 Aspilota karelica
 Aspilota kemneri
 Aspilota komarovi
 Aspilota konae
 Aspilota konishii
 Aspilota korsakovi
 Aspilota kotenkoi
 Aspilota kozyrevskii
 Aspilota krombeini
 Aspilota kurilicola
 Aspilota laevinota
 Aspilota latidens
 Aspilota latipelus
 Aspilota latitemporata
 Aspilota latitergum
 Aspilota leptocornis
 Aspilota lobidens
 Aspilota longibasis
 Aspilota longicarinata
 Aspilota longifemur
 Aspilota longiflagellata
 Aspilota louiseae
 Aspilota maacki
 Aspilota macrops
 Aspilota makita
 Aspilota manandrianaensis
 Aspilota megastigmatica
 Aspilota melabasis
 Aspilota microcera
 Aspilota microcubitalis
 Aspilota middendorffi
 Aspilota minima
 Aspilota minutissima
 Aspilota miraculosa
 Aspilota muravievi
 Aspilota nacta
 Aspilota naeviformis
 Aspilota nasica
 Aspilota necopinata
 Aspilota nemorivaga
 Aspilota nemostigma
 Aspilota neoterica
 Aspilota nervulata
 Aspilota nescita
 Aspilota nevae
 Aspilota nevelskoii
 Aspilota nidicola
 Aspilota nigrina
 Aspilota nipponica
 Aspilota nobilis
 Aspilota nomas
 Aspilota nonna
 Aspilota notata
 Aspilota nuntius
 Aspilota nutricola
 Aspilota obsessor
 Aspilota obsoleta
 Aspilota occulta
 Aspilota odarka
 Aspilota ordinaria
 Aspilota oriens
 Aspilota oroszi
 Aspilota parallela
 Aspilota parentalis
 Aspilota parvistigma
 Aspilota pauciarticulata
 Aspilota paupera
 Aspilota perai
 Aspilota petiolata
 Aspilota phyllotomae
 Aspilota pillerensis
 Aspilota pitiensis
 Aspilota pitralon
 Aspilota poiarkovi
 Aspilota praescutellaris
 Aspilota procreata
 Aspilota propedaemon
 Aspilota propeminimam
 Aspilota przewalskii
 Aspilota pulchella
 Aspilota puliciformis
 Aspilota pumiliformis
 Aspilota pygmipunctum
 Aspilota raddei
 Aspilota riazanovi
 Aspilota rufa
 Aspilota ruficornis
 Aspilota rugisignum
 Aspilota saileri
 Aspilota schlainingiaca
 Aspilota schpanbergi
 Aspilota schrenki
 Aspilota semiinsularis
 Aspilota semipilosa
 Aspilota shannoni
 Aspilota shiramizui
 Aspilota signimembris
 Aspilota sikkimensis
 Aspilota sinibasis
 Aspilota sitkensis
 Aspilota smithi
 Aspilota spiracula
 Aspilota spiracularis
 Aspilota stenogaster
 Aspilota stigmalineata
 Aspilota storeyi
 Aspilota styriaca
 Aspilota subcompressa
 Aspilota subcubiceps
 Aspilota supramedia
 Aspilota sylvaticae
 Aspilota tergitalis
 Aspilota tetragona
 Aspilota thurnensis
 Aspilota tianmushanica
 Aspilota tiatinoi
 Aspilota tillyardi
 Aspilota tshandolaz
 Aspilota tshirikovi
 Aspilota tuberula
 Aspilota turgida
 Aspilota ulmicola
 Aspilota ultor
 Aspilota umbritarsata
 Aspilota umbrosa
 Aspilota unca
 Aspilota univoca
 Aspilota vaga
 Aspilota valenciensis
 Aspilota vargus
 Aspilota variabilis
 Aspilota varinervis
 Aspilota vector
 Aspilota venatrix
 Aspilota ventasa
 Aspilota vernalis
 Aspilota viator
 Aspilota vicina
 Aspilota vincibilis
 Aspilota vindex
 Aspilota violator
 Aspilota visibilis
 Aspilota vladimirovka
 Aspilota vodara
 Aspilota volans
 Aspilota vostok
 Aspilota wilhelmensis
 Aspilota xuexini
 Aspilota ylia

References

Braconidae genera